Bob's Creek is a river in the James Bay and Abitibi River drainage basins in the community of Porcupine, City of Timmins, Cochrane District in northeastern Ontario, Canada. It flows  from Bobs Lake to its mouth at Porcupine Lake, the source of the Porcupine River.

Course
The lake flows via the Porcupine River and Frederick House River to the Abitibi River.

See also
List of rivers of Ontario

References

Rivers of Cochrane District